Slaves in Their Bonds may refer to:

Slaves in Their Bonds (novel), by Konstantinos Theotokis
Slaves in Their Bonds (film), based on the novel